Scriptania is a genus of moths of the family Noctuidae.

Species
Scriptania americana (Blanchard, 1852)
Scriptania michaelseni 
Scriptania nordenskjoldi

References
Natural History Museum Lepidoptera genus database

Hadeninae